Lapte is a commune in the Haute-Loire department in south-central France, located 23 kilometres southwest of Firminy. Lapte is surrounded by the communes Grazac, Chenereilles and Raucoules.

Geography
The municipality of Lapte covers 30.8 square kilometres. It is located at 860 metres above the Lignon du Velay river, where it converges with the Denieres. The river Lignon du Velay also flows through the commune.

Population

See also
 Communes of the Haute-Loire department

References

Communes of Haute-Loire